John White (9 November 1853 – 13 June 1922) was a member of the Queensland Legislative Assembly.

Early life
White was born at Dumbarton, Scotland, the son of Alexander and his wife Ellen (née Anderson). He was a company director and involved in several businesses.

On 10 April 1877 he married Maggie Frame (died 1901) with the marriage producing one son and three daughters. White died in Bundaberg in of June 1922 and was buried in the Bundaberg Cemetery.

Public life
White, representing the Ministerialists, won the 1903 by-election for the seat of Musgrave in the Queensland Assembly, replacing William O'Connell who had died in March of that year. He only held the seat until the next year at the 1904 state election when he was defeated by Labour's Charles Nielson.

In 1907, White had his revenge over Nielson and won back the seat. He remained the member for Musgrave until 1915 when he was once again beaten, this time by Thomas Armfield of the Labor Party. He stood again in at the 1918 state election but was once again defeated. During his time in parliament he was Secretary for Agriculture and Stock in 1912–1915.

References

Members of the Queensland Legislative Assembly
1853 births
1922 deaths